The Chicago Bruins were an American basketball team based in Chicago, Illinois. Owned by Chicago Bears football team owner George Halas, the Bruins were a member of the American Basketball League, a league that also featured other National Football League team owners and run by NFL President Joseph  Carr. Among the team's players were Bears quarterback Laurie Walquist and future Naismith Memorial Basketball Hall of Fame inductee Nat Holman.

The team later played in the National Basketball League (1939–1942) and World Professional Basketball Tournament.

References

 
Basketball teams established in 1925
Sports clubs disestablished in 1931
1931 disestablishments in Illinois
1925 establishments in Illinois